Pattanam Rasheed is an Indian make-up artist. He won the 55th National Film Award for Best Make-up Artist.

Awards
Kerala State Film Awards
 1992 Kerala State Film Award for Best Makeup Artist - Aadhaaram
 1997 Kerala State Film Award for Best Makeup Artist - Guru
 2002 Kerala State Film Award for Best Makeup Artist - Kunjikoonan
 2005 Kerala State Film Award for Best Makeup Artist - Anandabhadram
 2010 Kerala State Film Award for Best Makeup Artist - Yugapurushan
 2013 Kerala State Film Award for Best Makeup Artist - Swapaanam

 Other awards
 2012 Kerala Sangeetha Nataka Akademi Award

References

External links 

Pattanam Designory Pvt Ltd.

Living people
Indian make-up artists
Best Make-up National Film Award winners
Year of birth missing (living people)
Recipients of the Kerala Sangeetha Nataka Akademi Award